The Labour Decoration is a Belgian labour long service medal originally established on 7 November 1847 under the name "Industrial and Agricultural Decoration".  Its statute and design were reformed in 1958, since when it has retained its present name and design. The Labour Decoration is awarded to those who use their knowledge, talent and dedication in the pursuit of their work for a specified time. It is awarded by the Belgian Ministry of Employment and Labour.

Award statute

Classes
The Labour Decoration is awarded in two classes:
 The first class is awarded to those who can demonstrate thirty years of professional activity. Craftsmen who are not employees may be awarded the first class award if they can demonstrate twenty years of independent work in Belgium after their twenty-first birthday.
 The second class is awarded to those who can demonstrate twenty-five years of professional activity.
The decoration first class may also be awarded posthumously to workers who have been the victims of a fatal accident in the workplace, without consideration of age or citizenship.

Administrative procedures
The request for award of the decoration to a specific worker is usually submitted to the Ministry by the worker's employer or professional union. However, when this is not possible (such as when the worker is an independent craftsman without a professional union), the worker may file the request themselves.  The worker must be a resident of Belgium, although they may have worked in a foreign country for a Belgian company or worked in Belgium while residing in a different country.  The Decoration may be awarded to workers in the private sector and to contractual employees of the public sector.

After having been verified by the local authorities, applications are scrutinised by the Ministry of Employment and Labour, where the decision to award the Decoration or not will be taken. Award ceremonies are usually held on 8 April, 21 July and 15 November of each year.

Award of National Orders
After the Labour Decoration, workers may later also be awarded the gold medal and the golden palms of the Order of the Crown respectively after thirty-five and forty-five years of professional activity, or in the latter case, forty years at the time of retirement. The Knight's Cross of the Order of Leopold may be awarded to workers after fifty-five years of professional activity.

Award description
The insignia of the Labour Decoration is oval and made of silver, surrounded by a blue enamelled laurel wreath, with in its center a black enamelled oval medallion surrounded by a red enamelled border and in the center an emblem made of a beehive, a hammer and a compass and topped by the coat of arms of Belgium. The insignia is suspended by a ring through a lateral suspension loop through the orb of a pivot mounted royal crown. The reverse of the insignia is plain. The emblem and the royal crown are silver for the second class decoration and gold for the first class.

The ribbon of the Labour Decoration has three longitudinal stripes of equal width in the national colours of Belgium, black, yellow and red. The ribbon of the decoration first class is adorned with a rosette in the same colours.  The ribbon of the Labour Decoration awarded posthumously is adorned with a black enameled clasp with silver text in Flemish and French stating deceased at work.

See also

 List of Orders, Decorations and Medals of the Kingdom of Belgium

References
 Royal Decree of 7 November 1847 creating a distinction rewarding workers and craftsmen
 Royal Decree of 26 February 1957 regulating the posthumous award of a decoration to the victims of deadly labour accidents
 Royal Decree of 29 April 1958 on the name of the Labour Decoration
 Belgian Ministry of Employment and Labour, Clés pour les Décorations du Travail, Brussels, 2004
 André Borné, Honneur au travail: Distinctions honorifiques pour les travailleurs 1830-1980, Brussels, 1982
 Quinot H., 1950, Recueil illustré des décorations belges et congolaises, 4e Edition. (Hasselt)
 Cornet R., 1982, Recueil des dispositions légales et réglementaires régissant les ordres nationaux belges. 2e Ed. N.pl.,  (Brussels)
 Borné A.C., 1985, Distinctions honorifiques de la Belgique, 1830-1985 (Brussels)

External links
 Belgian Ministry of Employment and Labour (in French)

Orders, decorations, and medals of Belgium
Awards established in 1847
1847 establishments in Belgium